John Willoughby Cole, 2nd Earl of Enniskillen KP (23 March 1768 – 31 March 1840), styled Viscount Cole from 1789 to 1803, was an Irish peer and Member of Parliament.

Life 
Cole was the son of William Willoughby Cole, 1st Earl of Enniskillen. He succeeded his father to the peerage and the Florence Court estate in 1803.

In 1790 and in 1798, he was elected for Sligo Borough and Fermanagh. Both times, he chose to sit for the latter and represented the constituency in the Irish House of Commons until the Act of Union in 1801. After the Union, Cole was subsequently returned to the British House of Commons for Fermanagh, a seat he held until he succeeded his father to the earldom in 1803.  He then sat in the House of Lords as an Irish Representative Peer from 1804 to 1840.

He was also Governor of Fermanagh until 1831 and thereafter Lord Lieutenant of the county until his death. He was made a Knight of the Order of St Patrick in 1810 and in 1815  created Baron Grinstead, of Grinstead in the County of Wiltshire, in the Peerage of the United Kingdom.

Private life

Lord Enniskillen married Lady Charlotte Paget, daughter of Henry Paget, 1st Earl of Uxbridge, in 1805. They had five children:
 William Willoughby Cole, 3rd Earl of Enniskillen (1807–1886)
 Lt.-Col. Hon. Henry Arthur Cole (14 February 1809 – 2 July 1890)
 Lady Jane Anne Louisa Florence Cole (27 July 1811 – 23 March 1831)
 Hon. John Lowry Cole (8 June 1813 – 28 November 1882)
 Hon. Lowry Balfour Cole (6 June 1815 – 14 January 1818)

He died in March 1840, aged 72, and was succeeded in his titles by his eldest son William.

References
 Kidd, Charles, Williamson, David (editors). Debrett's Peerage and Baronetage (1990 edition). New York: St Martin's Press, 1990.
 Malcolmson, A. P. W. 'The Enniskillen Family, Estate and Archive'. Clogher Record 16 (2), 1998, pp. 81-122.

External links

1768 births
1840 deaths
Cole family (Anglo-Irish aristocracy)
Earls of Enniskillen
Irish MPs 1790–1797
Irish MPs 1798–1800
Knights of St Patrick
Lord-Lieutenants of Fermanagh
Cole, John Cole, Viscount
Cole, John Cole, Viscount
Cole, John Cole, Viscount
Enniskillen, E2
UK MPs who were granted peerages
Irish representative peers
Members of the Parliament of Ireland (pre-1801) for County Fermanagh constituencies
Members of the Parliament of Ireland (pre-1801) for County Sligo constituencies